Live in Hamburg is a live album by singer Roger Chapman and his then band The Shortlist, released in 1979. It was recorded on August 28, 1979 at the Markthalle Hamburg.

Track listing
All tracks composed by Roger Chapman; except where indicated

Side one

Side two

 
The 2005 CD reissue includes the bonus track "Hey Mr Policeman"

Personnel

 Roger Chapman  - Vocals
 Geoff Whitehorn - Guitar
 Tim Hinkley - Keyboards
 Jerome Rimson - Bass, Vocals
 Mel Collins - Saxophone
 Leonard "Stretch" Stretching - Drums
 Helen Hardy & Kathy O'Donaghue - Backing Vocals

References

Roger Chapman albums
Albums recorded at Markthalle Hamburg
1979 live albums